Interstate 580 (I-580) is a  auxiliary Interstate Highway in Western Nevada. It runs concurrently with US Route 395 (US 395) from an intersection with US 50 near the southern boundary of Carson City to the Reno Spaghetti Bowl interchange with I-80 in Reno. The freeway provides a high-speed direct route between Lake Tahoe and Carson City to Reno and I-80.

Construction on a freeway between Carson City and Reno was planned since 1956, but construction did not occur until 1964. The freeway opened in sections, with the final section opening on August 2, 2017. The I-580 designation was approved on October 27, 1978, but the freeway was not signed as such until the portion between Reno and Carson City was completed following the opening of the Galena Creek Bridge in late August 2012.

Route description

I-580 runs from an intersection with US 50 in Carson City to an interchange with I-80 near downtown Reno. The only portion remaining to be constructed is the interchange at the freeway's southern terminus. Within Reno, the freeway is designated as the Martin Luther King Jr. Freeway. Within Carson City, the freeway is designated the Carson City Deputy Sheriff Carl Howell Memorial Freeway, in honor of a sheriff's officer who was shot to death while attempting to rescue a victim of domestic violence from her house.

The freeway begins at the junction of US 395 with the Lake Tahoe leg of US 50 and follows the eastern edge of Eagle Valley, where most of the population of Carson City resides. The highway loosely follows the former alignments of Edmonds Drive and Lompa Lane along the eastern half of the city, which were relocated or truncated to make room for the freeway.

After rejoining the original alignment of US 395 at the Carson Tahoe Regional Medical Center, the highway crests Lakeview Hill to enter the Washoe Valley. The portion of I-580/US 395 and US 395 Alternate (US 395 Alt) through Washoe Valley are prone to high crosswinds, and, as such, the highways are frequently closed to high-profile vehicles. During prohibited times, trucks are rerouted to State Route 428 (SR 428/Eastlake Boulevard) and US 395 Alt, which is the old route of US 395. The high-wind area ends near the Bowers Mansion interchange near the northern end of the Washoe Valley.

Unlike the old US 395 which ran along the valley floor of Pleasant Valley, I-580 is routed in the mountains overlooking the valley and crosses the Galena Creek Bridge, the largest cathedral arch bridge in the world. Along the descent from these mountains into the Truckee Meadows and Reno, the highway cuts through the center of one of the largest geothermal powerplants in the US, Ormat Technologies's Steamboat Hills Complex power station. The freeway also passes between the clusters of Hot Springs in Steamboat Hills that provide steam for the plant.

At the extreme southern edge of Reno, the highway has a junction with the Mount Rose Highway (SR 431) and Geiger Grade (SR 341), which connect the freeway with North Lake Tahoe and Virginia City, respectively. Upon entering Reno, the freeway proceeds in a generally northern direction, crossing Virginia Street (SR 430), the old routing of US 395, several times. Along the way, the freeway passes to the side of The Summit mall, Meadowood Mall, and Reno–Tahoe International Airport. The elevated freeway also passes over a bus garage used by RTC Washoe, the local bus agency. The I-580 designation ends at the Reno Spaghetti Bowl where the highway crosses I-80; however, the freeway continues on only as US 395, heading toward the north valley neighborhoods of Sun Valley, Lemmon Valley, Stead, Cold Springs Valley, and Bordertown (parts of which are in the city of Reno) before eventually crossing the California state line.

History

Development of the I-580/US 395 freeway has been in planning since 1956, but significant construction did not occur until 1964. The freeway would be opened gradually over time and would initially be constructed in two main separate sections before 2012.

The first segment of freeway constructed along I-580 was the Washoe Valley segment, which was constructed between 1964 and 1970 between present-day Bowers Mansion Road/Carson–Reno Highway (exit 50, now exit 16) near Washoe City, south through Washoe Valley to just north of North Carson Street (exit 43, now exit 8) in Carson City.

The Reno section was constructed between 1973 and 1996. In 1973, the section running between US 395 Business (US 395 Bus; exit 72) to East Second Street/Glendale Avenue (exit 67, now exit 35) in Reno opened to traffic. This section was extended south to Mill Street (exit 66, now exit 34) in 1978, Plumb Lane/Villanova Drive (exit 65, now exit 33) in 1979, South Virginia Street/Kietzke Lane (exit 63, now exit 31) in 1981, Neil Road/Meadowood Mall Way (exit 62, now exit 30) in 1986, South Virginia Street (exit 61, now exit 29) in 1989, and Mount Rose Highway (exit 56, now exit 24) in 1996. The Carson City section was constructed in the 2000s with the construction of the Carson City Bypass project. The first phase completed the freeway from North Carson Street (exit 43, now exit 8) south to East William Street (exit 39, now exit 5) in 2006. The freeway was extended south to Fairview Drive (exit 38, now exit 3) in 2009. On August 2, 2017, the final section of the freeway between Fairview Drive (exit 38, now exit 3) and South Carson Street in Carson City opened to traffic.

In 2012, the section between Mount Rose Highway (exit 56, now exit 24) and Bowers Mansion Road/Carson–Reno Highway (exit 50, now exit 16) south of Reno opened following the opening of the Galena Creek Bridge to traffic in late August 2012, connecting the two main segments together. After the completion of this section, the freeway south of I-80 (US 395 southbound exit 68 and I-580 northbound exit 36) was signed as I-580, officially connecting Carson City to the Interstate Highway System. This left four other state capitals still not served by the Interstate Highway System: Dover, Delaware; Juneau, Alaska; Pierre, South Dakota; and Jefferson City, Missouri.

The I-580 designation was first approved by the American Association of State Highway and Transportation Officials (AASHTO) on October 27, 1978; at the time, this route extended from I-80 to US 395 (South Virginia Street, at exit 63, now exit 31). AASHTO approved the remainder of planned I-580, to the southern terminus at US 50, US 395 and US 395 Bus south of Carson City, at its December 7, 1984, meeting. Despite the route number being approved and being shown on some maps in the 1980s, I-580 was not signed along the Interstate until the freeway gap between Mount Rose Highway and Bowers Mansion Road was completed in 2012.

In October 2019, the Nevada Department of Transportation (NDOT) began replacing US 395 exit numbers with I-580 exit numbers per federal requirements on the Manual on Uniform Traffic Control Devices.

Future
The only project yet to be completed  is the South Carson Street single-point urban interchange (SPUI).

Exit list
Old exits on I-580 were numbered according to US 395 mileposts.

See also

References

External links

80-5 Nevada
80-5
5 Nevada
Transportation in Carson City, Nevada
Transportation in Washoe County, Nevada